Jeeva, popularly known as Lollu Sabha Jeeva, is an Indian actor and comedian. He started his career with Television show Lollu Sabha alongside another comedian Santhanam.

Filmography

Films

Television

References

External links
 

Living people
Tamil male actors
Tamil comedians
Tamil male television actors
Television personalities from Tamil Nadu
Male actors from Tamil Nadu
Male actors in Tamil cinema
21st-century Tamil male actors
Tamil Reality dancing competition contestants
Indian male comedians
1985 births